Anthony Charles Unger (13 June 1938 – 6 March 2014) was a Rhodesian field hockey player. He competed in the men's tournament at the 1964 Summer Olympics.

References

External links
 

1938 births
2014 deaths
Rhodesian male field hockey players
Olympic field hockey players of Rhodesia
Field hockey players at the 1964 Summer Olympics
Place of birth missing